Rahmatabad-e Deh-e Aqayi (also Romanized as Raḩmatābād-e Deh-e Āqāyī; also known as Raḩmatābād and Rahmat Abad Siriz) is a village in Siriz Rural District, Yazdanabad District, Zarand County, Kerman Province, Iran. At the 2006 census, its population was 58, in 13 families.

References 

Populated places in Zarand County